Alar (also, Allar and Allary) is a village and municipality in the Jalilabad Rayon of Azerbaijan.  It has a population of 9,702.

References 

Populated places in Jalilabad District (Azerbaijan)